Andrethrips is a genus of thrips in the family Phlaeothripidae, first described by Laurence Mound in 1974. The type species, Andrethrips floydi, is found in Malaysia on dead wood.

Species
 Andrethrips floydi
 Andrethrips insularis

References

Phlaeothripidae
Thrips
Thrips genera
Taxa named by Laurence Alfred Mound